Prohn is a municipality in the Vorpommern-Rügen district, in Mecklenburg-Vorpommern, Germany.

The Prohner Stausee is located in Prohn.

References